Te Uru Waitākere Contemporary Gallery (commonly known as Te Uru, formerly known as Lopdell House Gallery) is a contemporary art gallery located in Titirangi, Auckland. The gallery, which serves the West Auckland region, was originally opened within Lopdell House in 1986.

Redevelopment
The gallery closed in 2012 for a building project, with the new custom-built gallery, designed by Mitchell & Stout Architects, opening on 1 November 2014. The building project received a warm critical reception and has received awards in the 2015 Auckland Architecture Awards Public Building and Heritage categories, and the 2015 New Zealand Architecture Awards Public Building category.

Name change
The name of the gallery references the Māori phrase Te Hau a Uru (wind from the west), meaning the air currents the West Auckland (Waitākere/Hikurangi) area is known for. The name was chosen in consultation with local iwi Te Kawerau ā Maki.

Te Uru's inaugural director was Andrew Clifford, who was appointed in 2013. Clifford's departure was announced at the end of 2022, and he took on his next role as Director of the Sarjeant Gallery in March 2023.

Exhibitions
Te Uru hosts the annual Portage Ceramic Awards, New Zealand's premier prize for ceramics. Many external curators have realised independent projects at Te Uru and Lopdell House Gallery, including Ron Brownson, Karl Chitham, Moyra Elliot, Douglas Lloyd-Jenkins, Haru Sameshima, Peter Simpson, Linda Tyler and Ian Wedde. Damian Skinner was curator of the exhibitions Hattaway, Schoon, Walters: Madness and Modernism (1997) and Steve Rumsey and the Camera Club Movement 1948-64 (2003). Major exhibitions staged since the gallery's 2014 re-opening include Seung Yul Oh's HaPoom, Janet Lilo's Janet Lilo: Status Update, and Judy Millar's site-specific installation The Model World.

References

External links 
 

Buildings and structures in Auckland
Museums in Auckland
Art museums and galleries in Auckland
Art galleries in New Zealand
Art galleries established in 1986
1986 establishments in New Zealand
Tourist attractions in Auckland
Arts centres in New Zealand
Te Kawerau ā Maki
West Auckland, New Zealand